Brace's emerald (Riccordia bracei) is an extinct species of hummingbird which was endemic to the main island of the Bahamas, New Providence.

Description

Its size was 9.5 cm, the wing length 11.4 cm and length of the tail 2.7 cm. The black bill was slightly curved and conical pointed. The feet were black. The back exhibited a bronze green hue with a golden gleam. The head was similarly coloured to the back, with the absence of the golden gloss. Directly behind the eyes was a white spot. The throat gleamed in magnificent blue green colour hues. The abdomen had green feathers with ash-grey tips. The wings exhibited a purplish hue. The rectrices were greenish. The crissum (the undertail covert which surrounded the cloacal opening) was grey with a faint cinnamon hue at the edges.

Status and extinction

For more than a hundred years, Brace's emerald was only known by the type specimen, one single male which was shot by bird collector Lewis J. K. Brace on July 13, 1877 around three miles (4.8 kilometres) away from Nassau on the island of New Providence. The skin (which is unfortunately heavily damaged at the throat) is now at the Smithsonian Institution in Washington, D.C. The species was long ignored by ornithological authorities. In 1880 it was listed without commentary as a synonym of the Cuban emerald (Riccordia ricordii). Not until the 1930s was the unique status of the holotype even recognized, as it was seen as an aberrant specimen of the Cuban emerald that had become a vagrant to New Providence. American ornithologist James Bond was the first to discuss the differences between R. ricordii and R. bracei. In 1945, he split R. ricordii and regarded R. ricordii bracei  as a new subspecies. In contrast to the Cuban species, the specimen from New Providence was smaller, had a longer bill and a different plumage. In 1982, palaeornithologists William Hilgartner and Storrs Olson discovered fossil remains of three hummingbird species from the Pleistocene in the deposits in a cave of New Providence. These were the Bahama woodstar (Nesophlox evelynae), Cuban emerald (Riccordia ricordii), and another species, which was later identified as Riccordia bracei. This provided evidence that Brace had discovered a new hummingbird species which lived on New Providence since the Pleistocene. It formed a relict population, and most likely due to habitat loss and human disturbance (e.g. agriculture), it became extinct at the end of the 19th century.

References

Further reading
Flannery, Tim & Schouten, Peter (2001): A Gap in Nature

External links
Chlorostilbon bracei Lawrence, an extinct species of Hummingbird from New Providence Island, Bahamas (PDF, Fulltext, Engl.)

Brace's emerald
Birds of the Bahamas
Extinct birds of the Caribbean
Bird extinctions since 1500
Brace's emerald
Brace's emerald
Endemic birds of the Bahamas
Species known from a single specimen